Turbulent Skies (Dutch:Vliegende Hollanders) is a 2020 Dutch television series, directed by Joram Lürsen.Joram Lürsen.

The series is about Anthony Fokker and Albert Plesman, two aviation pioneers who stood at the cradle of civil aviation in the Netherlands. The series is set between 1919, the year of the First Air Traffic Exhibition Amsterdam, co-organized by Plesman, and 1939, the year in which Fokker died. Because few aircraft from this period have been preserved, a lot of CGI was used in making the series.

The series first aired on AVROTROS on October 18, 2020.

Cast

Episodes

References

2020s Dutch television series
Dutch drama television series
NPO 1 original programming